The Alcohol and Drug Foundation, created in 1959 as the Alcoholism Foundation of Victoria and formerly called the Australian Drug Foundation and the Alcohol and Drug Foundation of Victoria is a non-government, not-for-profit organisation based in Melbourne, Australia. The Alcohol and Drug Foundation's work is inclusive of both legal and illegal drugs on a national level and focuses on primary and secondary prevention. The Foundation has a vision to "create Australian culture that supports people so they can live healthy, safe and satisfying lives, unaffected by drug problems".

The Alcohol and Drug Foundation is made up of several directorates that each aim to prevent drug problems, as opposed to treating existing problem users. There is an information dissemination arm, the DrugInfo Clearinghouse; a research arm; a community support program, the Good Sports Program; and an alcohol advocacy group, the Community Alcohol Action Network.

History
The Alcohol and Drug Foundation was established in 1959 as the Alcoholism Foundation of Victoria. It was a response to the lack of services for alcohol-dependent people at the time and provided counselling and information. In those days, the Foundation called for a "coordinated attack by the community, involving education, treatment, and research".

Over the ensuing decades, the nature of drug use changed in Australia. The Victorian Foundation for Alcohol and Drug Dependence eventually led to the current name. Over time, treatment services became more widely available. The Alcohol and Drug Foundation moved away from this aspect of service delivery and began to develop primary and secondary prevention resources — a focus that remains to the present day.

Media attention 
The Alcohol and Drug Foundation is considered to be a national leader in the alcohol and other drug fields, and as such is often called upon by media outlets to comment on issues.

See also
Drug and Alcohol Review, an academic journal
Foundation for Alcohol Research and Education (FARE), formerly the Alcohol Education & Rehabilitation Foundation

References

Further reading

Organisations based in Melbourne
1959 establishments in Australia
Alcohol and health
Substance-related disorders